George Davidson Grant (June 25, 1870 – March 17, 1915) was a Canadian politician.

Born in Waterdown, Ontario, the son of Rev. Robert N. Grant, D.D., Scotch, and Marian E. McMullen, Irish, Grant educated at Common Schools, the Collegiate Institute and Osgoode Hall Law School in Toronto. A lawyer, was first elected to the Canadian House of Commons for the electoral district of Ontario North in a 1903 by-election held after the death of the sitting MP, Angus McLeod. A Liberal, He was re-elected again in 1904 and was defeated in 1908.

References
 
 The Canadian Parliament; biographical sketches and photo-engravures of the senators and members of the House of Commons of Canada. Being the tenth Parliament, elected November 3, 1904

1870 births
1915 deaths
Liberal Party of Canada MPs
Members of the House of Commons of Canada from Ontario
Politicians from Hamilton, Ontario